Klaas de Groot (11 May 1919 – 24 February 1994) was a Dutch wrestler. He competed in the men's Greco-Roman middleweight at the 1948 Summer Olympics.

References

External links
 

1919 births
1994 deaths
Dutch male sport wrestlers
Olympic wrestlers of the Netherlands
Wrestlers at the 1948 Summer Olympics
People from Wormerland
Sportspeople from North Holland